R Puppis (R Pup) is a variable star in the constellation Puppis.  It is a rare yellow hypergiant and a candidate member of the open cluster NGC 2439.  It is also an MK spectral standard for the class G2 0-Ia.

Variability

R Puppis was identified as a variable star in 1879, and described as having a range of over a magnitude.  Numerous observations over the following 100 years failed to confirm the variations, until the 1970s when clear brightness changes were observed.  These were confirmed by later observations, but with a total visual amplitude of only about 0.2 magnitudes.

Variable stars such as R Puppis have been described as pseudo-Cepheids, because they lie above the high-luminosity portion of the instability strip and their variations are similar to those of Cepheids although less regular.  R Puppis is formally classified as a semiregular variable of type SRd, meaning F, G, or K giants or supergiants.

References

Puppis
CD-31 4910
037415
2974
062058
Puppis, R
Semiregular variable stars
G-type hypergiants